Božena Mažgutová (born 2 December 1959) is a Slovak handball player. She competed in the women's tournament at the 1988 Summer Olympics.

References

1959 births
Living people
Slovak female handball players
Olympic handball players of Czechoslovakia
Handball players at the 1988 Summer Olympics
People from Sečovce
Sportspeople from the Košice Region